The following is a list of England women's national rugby union team international matches.

1987 to 1992

1993 to 1996

1997

1998

1999

2000

Notes

 England only sent its development squad to the 2000 FIRA tournament.

2001

Notes

 England only sent its development squad to the 2001 FIRA tournament.

2002

2003

2004

Notes

 England only sent its development squad to the 2004 FIRA tournament.

2005

2006

2007

Notes

 England only sent its development squad to the 2007 FIRA tournament.

2008

2009

2010

2011

2012

2013

2014

2015

2016

2017
England played in the Six Nations and World Cup. The team also toured to New Zealand and played international matches in the autumn.

2018
England played in the Six Nations as well as international matches in autumn.

2019
England played in the Six Nations and Women's Rugby Super Series as well as international matches in autumn.

2020
England played in the Six Nations.

2021
England played in the Six Nations.

2022
England will play in the Six Nations and the World Cup.

Other matches

2000s

2010s

Notes

References

Matches
Women's rugby union matches
Women
Women's sport-related lists